Pseudaeromonas pectinilytica is a Gram-negative, rod-shaped facultatively anaerobic and motile bacterium from the genus of Pseudaeromonas which has been isolated from a freshwater stream from Jeonju in Korea.

References

External links
Type strain of Pseudaeromonas pectinilytica at BacDive -  the Bacterial Diversity Metadatabase

Aeromonadales
Bacteria described in 2017